The golden-winged manakin (Masius chrysopterus) is a species of bird in the family Pipridae. It is the only member of the monotypic genus, Masius.

It is found in Colombia, Ecuador, Peru, and Venezuela. Its natural habitats are subtropical or tropical moist montane forests and heavily degraded former forest.

Diet 
The golden-winged manakin forages for small fruit, berries and insects.

References

Prum, Richard O., and Ann E. Johnson. "Display Behavior, Foraging Ecology, and Systematics of the Golden-Winged Manakin (Masius chrysopterus)." Wilson Bull. 99 (1987): 521–539. 14 Nov. 2007 .

golden-winged manakin
Birds of the Colombian Andes
Birds of the Ecuadorian Andes
Birds of the Venezuelan Andes
golden-winged manakin
Taxonomy articles created by Polbot